The 1972 Gillette Cup was the tenth Gillette Cup, an English limited overs county cricket tournament. It was held between 5 July and 2 September 1972. The tournament was won by Lancashire County Cricket Club who defeated Warwickshire County Cricket Club by 4 wickets in the final at Lord's.

Format
The seventeen first-class counties were joined by five Minor Counties: Buckinghamshire, Cambridgeshire, Durham, Oxfordshire and Wiltshire. Teams who won in the first round progressed to the second round. The winners in the second round then progressed to the quarter-final stage. Winners from the quarter-finals then progressed to the semi-finals from which the winners then went on to the final at Lord's which was held on 2 September 1972.

First round

Second round

Quarter-finals

Semi-finals

Final

References

External links
CricketArchive tournament page

Friends Provident Trophy seasons
Gillette Cup, 1972